Inna Nikolayevna Dyubanok (born 20 February 1990) is a Russian ice hockey defenseman, currently playing with Belye Medveditsy of the Zhenskaya Hockey League (ZhHL).

International career
Dyubanok was selected for the Russia national women's ice hockey team in the 2010 Winter Olympics. She played in all five games, recording one assist.

Dyubanok has also appeared for Russia at five IIHF Women's World Championships, Her first appearance came in 2008. She was a member of the team that won a bronze medal at the 2013 IIHF Women's World Championship.

In December 2017, she and seven other Russian hockey players were sanctioned for doping and their results from the women's ice hockey tournament at the 2014 Winter Olympics were disqualified as part of the Oswald Commission. All of the sanctioned players appealed the decision and the disqualifications were annulled for five of them; however, sanctions were upheld for Dyubanok, Galina Skiba, and Anna Shibanova.

She also competed in one junior tournament for the Russia women's national under-18 ice hockey team, playing in the inaugural event in 2008.

Career statistics

International career

References

External links
 

1990 births
Living people
People from Mozhaysk
Russian women's ice hockey defencemen
HC Tornado players
Belye Medveditsy players
Ice hockey players at the 2010 Winter Olympics
Ice hockey players at the 2014 Winter Olympics
Olympic ice hockey players of Russia
Doping cases in ice hockey
Russian sportspeople in doping cases
Sportspeople banned for life
Universiade gold medalists for Russia
Universiade medalists in ice hockey
Competitors at the 2017 Winter Universiade
Sportspeople from Moscow Oblast
20th-century Russian women
21st-century Russian women